Neu-Ulm is a Landkreis (district) in Swabia, Bavaria, Germany. It is bounded by (from the east and clockwise) the districts of Günzburg and Unterallgäu and the state of Baden-Württemberg (districts Biberach and Alb-Donau, city of Ulm).

The district was established in 1972 by merging the former districts of Neu-Ulm and Illertissen with the previously district-free city of Neu-Ulm.

The district includes the eastern metropolitan area of the city of Ulm. The Danube and its tributary, the Iller, form the western border of the district.

Coat of arms
The coat of arms displays:
 the moor from the arms of Kirchberg
 the horn from the arms of Neuffen

Towns and municipalities

References

External links

 (German)

 
Districts of Bavaria
Mittelschwaben
Swabia (Bavaria)